This is the list of preserved British industrial steam locomotives. This list does not contain preserved Fireless locomotives, for a list of preserved Fireless locomotives, visit List of fireless steam locomotives preserved in Britain. Notable locomotives that weren't initially intended for industrial railway service but worked on them (e.g. Furness Railway No. 20, later Barrow  Steelworks) will also be included as their rebuilding/resale classified them as industrial-employed steam locomotives.

Use of these locomotives
Private companies like Manning, Wardle & Company were building locomotives as early as 1858 when E.B. Wilson and Company closed. Later located themselves at Boyne Engine Works (1840) in Jack Lane. Within the next few years, Hunslet Engine Company and Hudswell Clarke moved in besides Manning Wardle. One of Manning Wardle's oldest recorded locomotives was Sidlesham, an ex-industrial 0-6-0ST later used on West Sussex Railway. There were also companies as old or older, Kitson & Company, formerly Todd, Kitson and Laird, formed in 1838.

Preserved locomotives
Over one hundred industrial tank engines have survived into preservation, from over ten different manufacturers, ranging from small to big numbers. Most of these locomotives were bought for preservation from industrial service or private use. These locomotives would've been cheap to purchase and maintain and many also formed the beginning of many heritage railways that have expanded from the start to the present.1

Andrew Barclay Sons & Co.
Over forty Andrew Barclay tank engines survived into preservation. The oldest survivor being No. 699 Swanscombe built in 1891. These lists might not contain every single locomotive preserved. Many 0-4-0 saddle tanks of small size have been preserved. Many preserved AB&SC locomotives have been preserved in several numbers at the Ribble Steam Railway, Tanfield Railway, Scottish Industrial Railway Centre and Bo’ness and Kinneil Railway. Only notable locomotives with a sizeable amount of information and/or a known recent/current status will be included. Many of these locomotives have been named after where they worked.

Avonside Engine Company
For a list of preserved Avonside locomotives, see List of preserved Avonside locomotives

W.G. Bagnall
W.G. Bagnall locomotive survive in great numbers, near those of Hudswell Clarke, Avonside, Andrew Barclay and Peckett & Sons numbers.

Dübs & Company
Only one British Dübs locomotive survives in the form of a 0-4-0 crane tank.

Kitson & Company
Out of all industrial Kitson & Co designs, one of their locomotive constructions were their long-boiler pannier tank locomotives built in the 1880s, originally a Stephenson design, with some working at Barrow Steel and two long boiler locomotives are believed to have worked at Dowlais Ironworks in Wales as No. 34 'Lord Wimbourne', one of which, No. 5 of 1883, survives today. Many other industrial Kitson locomotives survive, another well-known one being Lambton Railway 0-6-2T No. 29 of 1904.

Manning, Wardle & Co

Locomotives sold into industrial use

References

External links
 Industrial Locomotive Society 
 Industrial Railway Society

Industrial
Locomotives
British railway-related lists